Portofino is a village and resort in Italy.

Portofino may also refer to:
Portofino (musical), a 1958 Broadway musical
Lamborghini Portofino, a 1987 concept car developed for Lamborghini
Ferrari Portofino, a grand tourer produced by Ferrari since 2018
Portofino Tower, a 1997 residential skyscraper in Miami Beach, Florida
ManyDesigns Portofino, a 2006 web application framework